The LCDR Acis class was a class of fourteen steam locomotives of the 0-6-0 wheel arrangement. They were designed by William Martley for the London, Chatham and Dover Railway (LCDR) as goods locomotives.

During 1859–60 the LCDR board considered the need for new locomotives to operate lines then under construction. After consultation with various engineers, including Charles Patrick Stewart (of Sharp, Stewart and Company), Robert Sinclair (of the Eastern Counties Railway) and Thomas Russell Crampton, they decided upon forty new locomotives: eight 1st class fast locomotives, seventeen general purpose passenger locomotives, and fifteen goods locomotives. After discussion with William Martley, the quantities needed for the two passenger types were revised to five and 24 respectively. Tenders were sought, and these were considered in July 1860, when orders were placed with several firms for what were to become the Echo, Tiger and Acis classes.

The Acis class, intended to comprise 15 goods locomotives, were ordered from two firms: eight were ordered in July 1860 from Robert Stephenson & Co. at £3,320 each; and after negotiations with various firms concerning prices and delivery dates, a further seven were ordered in August 1860 from Sharp, Stewart & Co. at £3,284 each. As with the Echo and Tiger classes, the locomotives were equipped with the Cudworth coal-burning firebox. They were delivered to the LCDR between September 1861 and December 1862, but the Sharp Stewart order was reduced from seven to six in June 1862, and that firm was given an order for an additional locomotive of the Dawn class instead.

Like other LCDR locomotives delivered prior to 1874, the locomotives had no numbers at first, being distinguished by name. In November 1875, William Kirtley (who had replaced Martley following the latter's death in 1874) allotted the class letter H. The locomotives were then given the numbers 113–126. All were still in service when the South Eastern and Chatham Railway (SECR) was formed at the start of 1899: their numbers were increased by 459 to avoid duplication with former South Eastern Railway locomotives, and so they became SECR nos. 572–585. Four (nos. 574/5/9/85 were transferred to the duplicate list in 1903 and 1907 when their numbers were needed for new locomotives, and their numbers were suffixed with the letter "A". Withdrawal occurred between June 1903 and December 1908.

The cancelled Sharp, Stewart locomotive was to have been named Sphynx, and this name was used for one of the Tiger class in August 1862.

Notes

References

Acis
0-6-0 locomotives
Railway locomotives introduced in 1861
Sharp Stewart locomotives
Robert Stephenson and Company locomotives
Scrapped locomotives
Standard gauge steam locomotives of Great Britain